The 1996–97 Wessex Football League was the 11th season of the Wessex Football League. The league champions for the second time in their history were AFC Lymington, after remaining unbeaten for the whole season. There was no promotion to the Southern League, but Petersfield Town finished bottom and were relegated.

For sponsorship reasons, the league was known as the Jewson Wessex League.

League table
The league consisted of one division of 21 clubs, the same as the previous season, after Swanage Town & Herston were relegated and one new club joined:
Romsey Town, rejoining from the Hampshire League after being relegated in 1993.

References

Wessex Football League seasons
8